Walker Adams Gillette (born March 16, 1947) is a former American football wide receiver in the National Football League (NFL) for the San Diego Chargers, St. Louis Cardinals, and the New York Giants.  He played college football for the University of Richmond and was drafted 15th overall in the first round of the 1970 NFL Draft.  Gillette's father, Jim Gillette, also played in the NFL.

In 1990, Gillette was inducted into the Virginia Sports Hall of Fame.

References

External Links 

 Walker Gillette Stats, Height, Weight, Position, Draft, College | Pro-Football-Reference.com

1947 births
Living people
All-American college football players
American football tight ends
American football wide receivers
New York Giants players
Players of American football from Norfolk, Virginia
Richmond Spiders football players
San Diego Chargers players
St. Louis Cardinals (football) players